The Lovers/The Devil is the second album from American metalcore band Sworn In. It was released by Razor & Tie Recordings on April 7, 2015.

Concept 
According to frontman Tyler Dennen, The Lovers/The Devil is a 2-part concept album about a girl. The first part, titled The Lovers, covers the first 7 tracks, while the second part, named The Devil, covers the remaining 6 tracks. It progresses around a love story between an obsessive, romantic, emotionally unstable boy and a bitter, distant and cold girl. Halfway through the album, the roles are reversed as the boy becomes cold and distant after he realizes the girl does not love him back; and the girl realizes she made a mistake and goes on to solve it. Dennen cited as an inspiration for the album the bad relationship between his parents and bad relationships he himself has gone through.

Track listing

Members

Sworn In
 Tyler Dennen – vocals, Lyrics
 Eugene Kamlyuk – guitar
 Zakary Gibson – guitar
 Derek «Slim» Bolman – bass
 Chris George – drums

Production
Produced, Engineered, Mixed & mastered by Will Putney & Randy Leboeuf @ The Machine Shop
A&R by Mike Gitter
Management by Jeff Menig (The Power Kingdom)
Business management by Kieren Smith
Booking by Brad Wiseman (US, The Soroka Agency) & Marco Walzel (EU, Avocado Booking)
Illustrations by Michael Steinheiser
Packaging layout & design by Forefathers
Photo by Jonathan Wiener

References

2015 albums
Sworn In (band) albums
Razor & Tie albums
Albums produced by Will Putney